Vincenza Calì (born 15 October 1983 in Palermo) is a track and field sprint athlete who competes internationally for Italy.

She won three medals, to senior level, with the national relay team at the International athletics competitions.

Biography
She represented Italy at the 2008 Summer Olympics in Beijing. She competed at the 4x100 metres relay together with Anita Pistone, Giulia Arcioni and Audrey Alloh. In their first round heat they were however disqualified and eliminated for the final. She won two medals at the Mediterranean Games in Pescara. She has 11 caps in national team from 2001 to 2008.

She was engaged to football player of the Italy national football team, Gianluigi Buffon.

National records
 4×100 metres relay: 43.04 ( Annecy, 21 June 2008) - with Anita Pistone, Giulia Arcioni, Audrey Alloh - current holder

National titles
Vincenza Calì has won 7 times the individual national championship.
2 wins in the 100 metres (2004, 2005)
2 wins in the 200 metres (2004, 2005, 2008)
1 win in the 60 metres indoor (2008)

See also
 Italy national relay team
 Italian all-time lists - 100 metres
 Italian all-time lists - 200 metres
 Italian all-time lists - 4x100 metres relay

References

External links
 

1983 births
Living people
Italian female sprinters
Olympic athletes of Italy
Athletes (track and field) at the 2008 Summer Olympics
Sportspeople from Palermo
Athletics competitors of Fiamme Azzurre
Mediterranean Games silver medalists for Italy
Athletes (track and field) at the 2009 Mediterranean Games
Mediterranean Games medalists in athletics
Olympic female sprinters